"Shameless" is a song written by American singer Billy Joel and recorded on his 1989 album Storm Front. His version peaked at No. 40 on the Hot Adult Contemporary Tracks charts. Two years later, the song was covered by country music artist Garth Brooks on his third studio album, 1991's Ropin' the Wind. Brooks' rendering of the song was his seventh No. 1 hit on the Billboard country charts in late 1991. It also reached No. 71 on the UK Singles Chart.

In 1993, on stage in Boston, Joel introduced the song by saying, "I want[ed] to write a song, like a Jimi Hendrix song, you know. Back in the sixties, he was one of my idols, Jimi Hendrix." Joel also mentioned the Hendrix inspiration at a talk in Nuremberg, in 1995.

Background and production

Garth Brooks version
The song features harmony vocals by Trisha Yearwood, Brooks's later wife. Brooks provided the following background information on the song in the booklet liner notes from his compilation, The Hits:

<blockquote>"Shameless" was the longest shot we took with a song. I was talked into becoming a member of a CD club...you know, the 40,000 CD's for a penny deal. With those clubs, they write you with the selection of the month. If you don't write back and cancel, then they send it to you and charge you for it. I was on the road for six months with no one to check the mail and came home to find six compact discs in my mailbox. Storm Front by Billy Joel was one of them. I hadn't listened to Billy Joel since the late seventies, probably since Glass Houses. I fell in love with the album and fell back in love with Billy Joel's music. One of his songs really captured me, a song called "Shameless." I kept watching it, and when he did not release it as a single, we contacted his people in the hopes that we could cut it. His people sent us a letter acknowledging that he knew who I was and was very honored that I was cutting it. That was quite a compliment for me then, as it is now. My hope is that Billy, as writer, hears this cut and says, "Yeah, man, the guy's got balls."</blockquote>

Brooks performed "Shameless" with Joel during Joel's Last Play at Shea'' concerts in 2008, and after Brooks performed it in his Central Park concert in 1997, Joel came out on stage and they sang a duet of "New York State of Mind." In 2011, Joel and Brooks performed the song together again when Brooks was inducted to the Songwriters Hall of Fame by Joel.

Critical reception

Garth Brooks version
Stephen Thomas Erlewine of Allmusic described Brooks' rendering of the song favorably in his review of the album, saying that Brooks "made his '70s rock influences more explicit" by "transform[ing] the song from a rock power ballad into contemporary country."

Chart positions

Billy Joel version

Garth Brooks version

"Shameless" entered the Billboard Hot Country Singles chart on October 19, 1991.

Year-end charts

References

1991 singles
Billy Joel songs
Garth Brooks songs
Songs written by Billy Joel
Song recordings produced by Allen Reynolds
Columbia Records singles
Liberty Records singles
1989 songs